Ertuğrul Dursun Önkuzu (1 January 1948 - 23 November 1970) was a 22-year-old Turkish right-wing student from Zile, Tokat. He was studying at the Ankara Technical Higher Teacher Training School for Boys when he was murdered by left-wing students on 23 November 1970.

Incident 
On 20 November 1970, Önkuzu was kidnapped by a group of left-wing students in Ankara. According to the right wing daily Yeni Akit, he was badly tortured.  On 23 November he was defenestrated from the third floor of a school. Some reports claim he was tortured to death and his corpse was thrown from the window. 

However, one source states that he died as a result of falling 11 meters, not from torture.

After Önkuzu's murder, 3 left-wing students, Hikmet Parabakan, Abbas Balkır and Sinan Gündüz were kidnapped by idealists. The three students were hung from the ceiling by their legs, their skin was cut with razor blades and their fingers were broken.

Trials 
Six people were arrested and convicted related to the incident. They all were released in 1974.

Further reading

See also 
 Murder of Fırat Çakıroğlu

References 

Political violence in Turkey
1970 murders in Turkey
Murder in Ankara
1948 births
1970 deaths
Deaths by defenestration
Deaths by person in Asia
Murdered students
Turkish torture victims